Dendrophysellum is a genus of fungi in the family Corticiaceae. The genus is monotypic, containing the single species Dendrophysellum amurense, found in the former USSR.

References

External links
 

Corticiales
Monotypic Basidiomycota genera